Hyastenus elatus is a species of crab in the family Epialtidae. It is one of several decorator crabs, habitually covering itself in aposematic sponges which may also serve as camouflage.

References

Majoidea
Crustaceans of the Pacific Ocean
Crustaceans described in 1986